Galloway is a region in southwestern Scotland comprising the historic counties of Wigtownshire and Kirkcudbrightshire. It is administered as part of the council area of Dumfries and Galloway.

A native or inhabitant of Galloway is called a Gallovidian. The place name Galloway is derived from the Gaelic  ("amongst the "). The , literally meaning "Stranger-"; the specific identity of whom the term was applied to is unknown, but the predominant view is that it referred to an ethnic and/or cultural identity such as the Strathclyde Britons or another related but distinct population. A popular theory is that it refers to a population of mixed Scandinavian and Gaelic ethnicity that may have inhabited Galloway in the Middle Ages.

Galloway is bounded by sea to the west and south, the Galloway Hills to the north, and the River Nith to the east; the border between Kirkcudbrightshire and Wigtownshire is marked by the River Cree.  The definition has, however, fluctuated greatly in size over history.

A hardy breed of black, hornless cattle named Galloway cattle is native to the region, in addition to the more distinctive 'Belted Galloway' or 'Beltie'.

Geography and landforms

Galloway comprises the part of Scotland lying southwards from the Southern Upland watershed and westward from the River Nith. Traditionally it has been described as stretching from "the braes of Glenapp to the Nith". The valleys of three rivers, the Urr Water, the Water of Ken and River Dee, and the Cree, all running north–south, provide much of the good arable land, although there is also some arable land on the coast. Generally however the landscape is rugged and much of the soil is shallow. The generally south slope and southern coast make for mild and wet climate, and there is a great deal of good pasture.

The northern part of Galloway is exceedingly rugged and forms the largest remaining wilderness in Britain south of the Highlands.  This area is known as the Galloway Hills.

Land use
Historically Galloway has been known both for horses and for cattle rearing, and milk and beef production are both still major industries. There is also substantial timber production and some fisheries. The combination of hills and high rainfall make Galloway ideal for hydroelectric power production, and the Galloway Hydro Power scheme was begun in 1929. Since then, electricity generation has been a significant industry. More recently wind turbines have been installed at a number of locations on the watershed, and a large offshore wind-power plant is planned, increasing Galloway's 'green energy' production.

History

Galloway landmarks on Ptolemy's map

The 2nd century geographer Ptolemy produced a map of Britain in his Geography, in which he describes the landmarks and peoples of the island. The landmarks were identified long ago, and a number of them relate to Galloway:

's exact position is uncertain except that it was 'on Loch Ryan', close to modern day Stranraer; it is possible that it is the modern settlement of Dunragit.

Early Galloway

The earliest recorded inhabitants were Brythonic Celts, recorded by the Romans as the  tribe. According to tradition, before the end of Roman rule in Britain, St. Ninian established a church or monastery at Whithorn, Wigtownshire, which remained an important place of pilgrimage until the Reformation. The county is rich in prehistoric monuments and relics, amongst the most notable of which are the Drumtroddan standing stones (and cup-and-ring carvings), the Torhousekie Stone Circle, both in Wigtownshire and Cairnholy (a Neolithic chambered cairn). There is also evidence of one of the earliest pit-fall traps in Europe which was discovered near Glenluce, Wigtownshire.

Middle Ages

A Brythonic speaking kingdom dominated Galloway until the late 7th century when it was absorbed by the English kingdom of Bernicia.

English prevalence was supplanted by Britons and Norse-Gaelic peoples between the 9th and the 11th century. This can be seen in the context of both the vacuum left by Northumbria being filled by the resurgent Cumbric Britons and the influx of the Norse into the Irish Sea, including settlement in the Isle of Man and in the now English region of western Cumbria immediately south of Galloway.

If it had not been for Fergus of Galloway who established himself in Galloway, the region would rapidly have been absorbed by Scotland. This did not happen because Fergus, his sons, grandsons and great-grandson Alan, Lord of Galloway, shifted their allegiance between Scottish and English kings. During a period of Scottish allegiance a Galloway contingent followed David, King of Scots in his invasion of England and led the attack in his defeat at the Battle of the Standard (1138).

Alan died in 1234. He had three daughters and an illegitimate son Thomas. The 'Community of Galloway' wanted Thomas as their 'king'. Alexander III of Scotland supported the daughters (or rather their husbands) and invaded Galloway. The Community of Galloway was defeated, and Galloway divided up between Alan's daughters, thus bringing Galloway's independent existence to an end.

Alan's eldest daughter,  (Latinized as Dervorguilla), married John de Balliol, and their son (also John) became one of the candidates for the Scottish Crown. Consequently, Scotland's Wars of Independence were disproportionately fought in Galloway.

There were a large number of new Gaelic placenames being coined post 1320 (e.g. Balmaclellan), because Galloway retained a substantial Gaelic speaking population for several centuries more. Following the Wars of Independence, Galloway became the fief of Archibald the Grim, Earl of Douglas. In 1369 he received the part of Galloway east of the River Cree, where he appointed a steward to administer the area, which became known as the Stewartry of Kirkcudbright. The following year, he acquired the part of Galloway west of the Cree, which continued to be administered by the king's sheriff, and so became known as the Shire of Wigtown. The two parts of Galloway thereafter were administered separately, becoming separate counties.

Whithorn remained an important cultural centre, and all the medieval Kings of Scots made pilgrimages there.

Modern history
Galwegian Gaelic seems to have lasted longer than Gaelic in other parts of Lowland Scotland, and Margaret McMurray (d. 1760) of Carrick (outside modern Galloway) appears to have been the last recorded speaker.

In the years after the Union of the Crowns in 1603, Galloway underwent radical change, during the War of the Three Kingdoms and Covenanter rebellion.

In modern times, Stranraer was a major ferry port, but the company have now moved to Cairnryan.

Galloway in literature

Galloway has been the setting of a number of novels, including Walter Scott's Guy Mannering.
Other novels include the historical fiction trilogy by Liz Curtis Higgs, Thorn in My Heart, Fair is the Rose, and Whence Came a Prince. Richard Hannay flees London to lie low in Galloway in John Buchan's novel The Thirty-nine Steps. Five Red Herrings, a whodunit by Dorothy L. Sayers, initially published in the US as Suspicious Characters, sees Lord Peter Wimsey, on holiday in Kirkcudbright, investigating the death of an artist living at Gatehouse of Fleet; the book contains some remarkable descriptions of the countryside.  S R Crockett, a bestselling writer of historical romances active before the First World War, set several novels in the region including The Raiders and Silver Sand.

See also
Galloway Association of Glasgow
Galloway pony

References 

 Brooke, D: Wild Men and Holy Places. Edinburgh: Canongate Press, 1994 
 Oram, Richard, The Lordship of Galloway. University of St Andrews, 1988

External links

Galloway Dialect at Scots Language Centre

 
Geography of Dumfries and Galloway